Pambar is the name of three rivers in South India:

 Pambar River (Northern Tamil Nadu)
 Pambar River (Southern Tamil Nadu)
 Pambar River (Kerala)